M32 may refer to:

 M32 (catamaran), a lightweight, high-performance, multihull sailing vessel
 Messier 32, an elliptical galaxy in the constellation Andromeda
 M32 motorway, a motorway in Bristol, England
 M-32 (Michigan highway), a state highway traversing northern lower Michigan from the town of East Jordan to the city of Alpena
 M32 MGL, a multiple grenade launcher
 M32 Tank Recovery Vehicle, a variant of the M4 Sherman tank
 HMS M32, an M29-class monitor warship of the Royal Navy
 M32 (Cape Town), a Metropolitan Route in Cape Town, South Africa
 M32 (Johannesburg), a Metropolitan Route in Johannesburg, South Africa
 M32 (Durban), a Metropolitan Route in Durban, South Africa
 Samsung Galaxy M32, an Android based smartphone
 M32 helmet, Czechoslovak army steel helmet